The Scopi is a 3,190-metre-high mountain in the Lepontine Alps, overlooking Lukmanier Pass on the border between the cantons of Ticino and Graubünden.

A cable car (not accessible to public) connects the summit from the road of Lukmanier Pass below the dam, and on the top lies a radar (FLORAKO) and an air traffic control building, owned by the Swiss Army. There are, however, no climbing restrictions, and the summit can by reached via a marked trail from Lai da Sontga Maria near the pass.

References

External links
 Scopi on Summitpost
 Scopi on Hikr

Mountains of the Alps
Alpine three-thousanders
Mountains of Switzerland
Mountains of Graubünden
Mountains of Ticino
Graubünden–Ticino border
Lepontine Alps
Medel (Lucmagn)